The Madagascar scops owl (Otus rutilus), also known as the Malagasy scops owl or Rainforest scops owl, is a species of owl in the family Strigidae. It is found throughout Madagascar, now that is has recently been lumped with the Torotoroka scops owl (O. r. madagascariensis), with which it was long considered a separate species from. The nominate O. r. rutilus is referred to as Rainforest scops owl.

Description
The Madagascar scops owl is a relatively small owl with short, rounded wings and short erectile ear-tufts on top of the head. There are three morphs recorded of this species: a grey-plumaged morph, a brown-plumaged morph and a rufous-plumaged morph. Features which stand out from the main plumage color are the pale eyebrows, light spots on the scapulars and the barring on the wings and outer tail feathers. Sometimes the crown and the underparts are streaked. The bill has a black tip and may be dull green through to yellowish-grey and the eyes are yellow.

Voice
The typical song of the Madagascar scops owl is a series of between five and nine short, reverberating, clear hoots which can be rendered as "pu-pu-pu-pu-pu". These are repeated at intervals of several seconds.

Distribution and habitat
The Madagascar scops owl is endemic to Madagascar where it is found throughout the island. As its common name "Rainforest" suggests, the nominate subspecies O. r. rutilus prefer humid tropical forest and bush and occurs in the east of the island, whereas the Torotoroka subspecies, O. r. madagascariensis, prefers drier habitats and occurs in the west of the island.

Behaviour
The Madagascar scops owl feeds on invertebrates, such as grasshoppers, beetles, moths and spiders, as well as taking small vertebrates. It hunts mostly at night from a perch but will also catch moths on the wing. It roosts during the day, hidden in dense foliage, on a branch or next to the tree trunk. Little is known about the breeding biology of this species. The nest is in a tree hollow and 3 or 4 white eggs are laid, probably in November and December.

Taxonomy
The rainforest scops owl, the Mayotte scops owl (Otus mayottensis), the Pemba scops owl (Otus pembaensis) and the torotoroka scops owl (Otus madagascarensis) have all previously been lumped as one species.  The taxonomy is in a state of flux but recent genetic studies have placed the Pemba scops owl closer to the clade containing the African scops owl (Otus sengalensis), while the Mayotte scops owl is clearly separate from the remaining two.  The status of the rainforestdebatable as there is very little genetic distance between the two taxa and subsequent studies have suggested that the plumage differences between O. rutilus and O. madagascariensis are small and that their voices intergrade. Therefore the rainforest and Torotoroka scops owls become subspecies under the new name Madagascar scops owl, taking the scientific name Otus rutilus.

References

rainforest scops owl
Endemic birds of Madagascar
rainforest scops owl
rainforest scops owl
rainforest scops owl
Taxonomy articles created by Polbot